The Herald of Freedom, established 1829, was a newspaper published by P. T. Barnum, based in Bethel, Connecticut. The newspaper was created in reaction against the religious oppression and militant Calvinism Barnum had grown up with.

References

External links
 

Defunct newspapers published in Connecticut
Newspapers established in 1829
Publications with year of disestablishment missing
1829 establishments in Connecticut
P. T. Barnum